Shah Reza Mahalleh (also Romanized as Shāh Reẕā Maḩalleh; also known as Shāh Rez̧ā and Shāh Reẕā) is a village in Siyahrud Rural District, in the Central District of Juybar County, Mazandaran Province, Iran. At the 2006 census, its population was 142, in 42 families.

References 

Populated places in Juybar County